Tierisch Kölsch - Tales From the Domstadt Zoo, is a German television/documentary series. It was broadcast by the ZDF for nine seasons, from 2006-2010. Tierisch Kölsch presents the behind-the-scene stories of the Domstadt zoo, including both animal and employee stories.

See also
List of German television series

External links
 

2006 German television series debuts
2010 German television series endings
Television series about animals
Television shows set in Cologne
German-language television shows
ZDF original programming